The Broadway Tower is a high-rise building in downtown Portland, Oregon, in the United States. The 19-story tower has offices for several companies, as well as a hotel on its lower nine floors. It began construction in 2016 and opened in 2018.

History

Excavation on the Broadway Tower site began in June 2016 and was completed in November. The building was completed in November 2018.

Tenants
A 180-room hotel occupies the building's first nine floors. The Radisson RED Portland Downtown opened in November 2018. The hotel now operates as Hotel Vance, Portland, a Tribute Portfolio Hotel.

Amazon signed a lease for approximately 85,000 square feet of the building in January 2018.

The law firm Markowitz Herbold occupies the top two floors.

See also
 Beastro
 List of tallest buildings in Portland, Oregon

References

External links

2018 establishments in Oregon
Hotel buildings completed in 2018
Office buildings completed in 2018
Buildings and structures in Portland, Oregon
Southwest Portland, Oregon